The IVth Crusade is the fourth studio album by British death metal band Bolt Thrower.  It was recorded at Sawmill Studios in August 1992 and produced by Bolt Thrower and Colin Richardson. The album was engineered by John Cornfield and  mixed at Fon studios. It was also engineered by Alan Fisch and Steve Harris. It was released through Earache Records as Mosh 70 in 1992. The album title comes from the Fourth Crusade and the capturing of Constantinople. The cover artwork is a painting from Eugène Delacroix, showing "The Entry of the Crusaders in Constantinople".

For this album Bolt Thrower slowed down considerably compared to War Master, focusing more on playing heavy riffs and a thick sound. The album features a more death/doom metal-driven style, and which was influenced by doom metal bands including Candlemass and Pentagram.  Particularly, this style is apparent in songs like "This Time It's War" or "As the World Burns".

"Embers" opens and ends as "Cenotaph" did on the previous album War Master, and leads into "Powder Burns" on Mercenary.

Track listing 
All songs written by Bolt Thrower

Personnel 
Bolt Thrower
 Karl Willetts – vocals
 Gavin Ward – guitars
 Barry Thomson – guitars
 Jo Bench – bass
 Andrew Whale – drums

Production
 Eugène Delacroix – cover art
 Paul McHale – design
 John Cornfield – engineering
 Alan Fisch – mixing
 Steve Harris – mixing
 Colin Richardson – producer, recording

References 

1992 albums
Bolt Thrower albums
Earache Records albums
Relativity Records albums
Albums produced by Colin Richardson